"Love Is Like a Butterfly" is a song written and recorded by American country music artist Dolly Parton and released in August 1974 as the first single and title track from the album Love Is Like a Butterfly.  It was her overall fourth number one on the country chart as a solo artist (and her third consecutive number one).  The single stayed at number one for one week and spent a total of twelve weeks on the country chart.

Personnel
Dolly Parton — vocals
Jimmy Colvard, Dave Kirby, Bruce Osbon, Bobby Thompson — guitars
Bobby Dyson — bass
Larrie Londin — drums
Jerry Smith — piano
Stu Basore — steel guitar
The Lea Jane Singers — background vocals

Chart performance

Popular culture
Parton used "Love Is Like a Butterfly" as the opening theme for her 1976–77 TV variety show Dolly!  She also uses a butterfly as the "W" in the trade dress for her Dollywood theme park.
A version sung by Clare Torry, was used as the theme to BBC TV comedy series Butterflies.
On November 27, 2012, Parton and Stephen Colbert performed it together on The Colbert Report.

References

1974 singles
Songs written by Dolly Parton
Dolly Parton songs
Song recordings produced by Bob Ferguson (musician)
RCA Victor singles
1974 songs